The occipital ridge is the region at the back of the head where the base of the skull meets the spine.

This general area is quite vulnerable, and as such, offensive maneuvers (esp. in martial arts) have been created to target the occipital ridge.  If the area is hit with sufficient force, it will cause immediate blackout and potential spinal injury. 

Bones of the head and neck